Ernest G. Eagleson (January 13, 1864 – August 17, 1956) was an American politician who served two nonconsecutive terms as mayor of Boise, Idaho, in the 1910s and 1920s.

References

 Mayors of Boise - Past and Present
 Idaho State Historical Society Reference Series, Corrected List of Mayors, 1867-1996

Mayors of Boise, Idaho
1864 births
1956 deaths